Fernando Ramírez de Haro y Valdés, 16th Count of Bornos, 15th Count of Murillo, GE, RMCS (b. 17 December 1949) is a Spanish nobleman and landowner, the current president of Real Club de la Puerta de Hierro. Born in Madrid, Bornos is the elder son of the late Ignacio Ramírez de Haro, 15th Count of Bornos, Grandee of Spain (1918–2010), and his wife Beatriz Valdés, 4th Marchioness of Casa Valdés. On 5 November 1975, his father ceded him the Countship of Murillo.

Family
He married, on 1 September 1974, Esperanza Aguirre y Gil de Biedma, prominent politician and former President of the Community of Madrid, eldest daughter of José Luis Aguirre y Borrel and Piedad Gil de Biedma y Vega de Seoane, daughter of the 3rd Count of Sepúlveda. They have two sons:

Don Fernando Ramírez de Haro, 10th Marquess of Villanueva del Duero, Grandee of Spain, (b. 23 August 1976).
Don Álvaro Ramírez de Haro, 16th Count of Villariezo, (b. 4 April 1980).

Ancestry

See also
Count of Bornos

Notes

Sources
Elenco de Grandezas y Títulos Nobiliarios Españoles, Hidalguía Editions, 2008

|-

|-

Counts of Spain
1949 births
Living people
Nobility from Madrid
Fernando Ramirez
Grandees of Spain
Spanish nobility